Edit Punk (born 6 May 1967) is a Hungarian rower. She competed in the women's double sculls event at the 1992 Summer Olympics.

References

External links
 

1967 births
Living people
Hungarian female rowers
Olympic rowers of Hungary
Rowers at the 1992 Summer Olympics
Rowers from Budapest